Thandiani (literally meaning "very cold") is a hill station in the Galyat area of the Khyber Pakhtunkhwa Province of Pakistan. To the east beyond the Kunhar River lies the snow-covered Pir Panjal mountain range of Kashmir. Visible to the north and northeast are the mountains of Kohistan and Kaghan. To the northwest are the snowy ranges of Swat and Chitral. Most of the people residing here belong to the  Qureshi- Damal ,  Karlal, Syed, Awan, Abbasi, and Gujjar tribes.

History
Thandiani was originally granted as a lease to some members of the Battye family in British India, who were Christian missionaries and also found in civil and military service, and who produced scions such as Wigram Battye and Quintin Battye. The Battyes subsequently gifted the location to the church authorities, where a sanatorium and various other facilities were set up during the British rule, mostly for the convenience of missionaries, Anglican church personnel and officers stationed at the neighbouring cantonment of Abbottabad. It also contained some private European houses, a camping ground, a small bazaar, and the small seasonal church of St. Xavier in the Wilderness which were occupied only during the summer months.

Tourism

Thandiani is characterized by excellent weather and lush greenery in the summer months, and snow-covered vistas and hills in the winter. Many tourists from Khyber Pakhtunkhwa and all over Pakistan visit here, especially in the summer season. Being at a high altitude, with attractive scenery and several hiking trails into the forests and other nearby locations, it is a very attractive prospect.

A beautiful trek leads to Thandiani from Abbottabad that passes through Dagri Naka.

It has famous villages namely, Sialkot, Chamiyali, Kotla, Basali and Pattan Kallan. Sialkot is the nearest village in fact Thandiyani Lis in the boundaries of Sialkot village.
Village Sialkot''
Its Well known personalities are Jan Muhammad Qureshi s/o Muhammad Ismail Qureshi (Social Worker and representative of Janyal Bradari) retired as Tech Officer from OGDCL, Pakistan and had strong hold in politics as well as arbitrary committee.
Muhammad Bashir Qureshi belongs to Janyal Bradari and Ex. chairman of Zakat Committee also retired from NAtional Bank of Pakistan.
Haji Ali Akbar Qureshi (Ex-Nazim UC-Patan Kallan) representative of Rakhyal Bradari & member of arbitrary committee.
Jan Muhammad Qureshi Ex-Nazim UC Pattan Kallan representative of Jamyaal Braadri & member of arbitrary committee.
Sufi Muhammad representative of Lashkriyal Bradari & member of arbitrary committee.
Zulfiqar Qureshi representative of Oundwaall Bradari & member of arbitrary committee.

Forests and Wildlife 

The mountains around Thandiani are quite thickly forested compared to most other hill stations in the locality, which have suffered some degree of deforestation over time. The local wildlife includes leopards, monkeys, several kinds of pheasants and the increasingly rare flying squirrel and pine marten, to name only a few.

2005 earthquake 

The area and its surrounding villages were damaged by the 2005 Kashmir earthquake.
Now, it is very developed spot for tourists.

References

External links
 Thandiani Revisited
 
   Pictures of Thandiani
   VTEAMS/NXB Thandiani Trip March 2009

Galyat of Pakistan
Populated places in Abbottabad District
Abbottabad District
Hill stations in Pakistan
Tourist attractions in Khyber Pakhtunkhwa